is a railway station in Atsuta-ku, Nagoya, Japan, operated by Central Japan Railway Company (JR Tōkai).

Lines
Atsuta Station is served by the Tōkaidō Main Line, and is located 360.8 kilometers from the starting point of the line at Tokyo Station.

Station layout
The station has two island platforms, which are connected to the station building by a footbridge. Tracks 2 and 3 are in normal use, and tracks 1 and 4 are used for special trains. The station building has automated ticket machines, TOICA automated turnstiles and a staffed ticket office.

Platforms

Adjacent stations

|-
!colspan=5|Central Japan Railway Company

Station history
Atsuta Station was opened on March 1, 1886, with the completion of the Japanese Government Railway (JGR) line connecting to Taketoyo Station. This line was named the Tōkaidō Line in 1895 and the Tōkaidō Main Line in 1909. The station was relocated to its present location on September 1, 1896. The station was destroyed in the Bombing of Nagoya in World War II on May 17, 1945, and was rebuilt on June 22, 1947. The JGR became the JNR after World War II. A new station building was completed in October 1982. With the privatization and dissolution of the JNR on April 1, 1987, the station came under the control of the  Central Japan Railway Company.

Station numbering was introduced to the section of the Tōkaidō Line operated JR Central in March 2018; Atsuta Station was assigned station number CA65.

Passenger statistics
In fiscal 2017, the station was used by an average of 3,057 passengers daily

Surrounding area
Atsuta Shrine
Tokai Polytechnic College
Nippon Sharyo head office

See also
 List of Railway Stations in Japan

References

Yoshikawa, Fumio. Tokaido-sen 130-nen no ayumi. Grand-Prix Publishing (2002) .

External links

Official home page

Atsuta-ku, Nagoya
Railway stations in Japan opened in 1886
Tōkaidō Main Line
Stations of Central Japan Railway Company
Railway stations in Nagoya
Buildings and structures in Japan destroyed during World War II